The Holman Day House is a historic house at 2 Goff Street in Auburn, Maine.  Built in 1895, it is one of the state's finest examples of Queen Anne architecture, and is further notable as the home of Maine author Holman Day.  It was listed on the National Register of Historic Places in 1978.

Description and history
The Day House is set at the northeast corner of Court and Goff Streets, overlooking Auburn's downtown area.  It is a -story wood-frame structure, roughly rectangular in plan, with three-story tower at the corner and a two-story ell connecting the main house to a carriage barn.  It has a hip roof, with a two-story projecting gable section to the left, and a smaller gable at the front, to the right of the tower.  The tower is capped by a conical roof, with swag panels between the levels.  The front-facing gable has a small Palladian window, while the left projection has a wide two-story bay window, with an oculus window in the gable.  A porch extends across the front and around the side, and is ornately decorated, with a turned balustrade and posts, and a decorative trellis-like valance.  The interior is similarly richly decorated in high quality materials.

The house was built in 1895 for Holman Day and his wife, Helen Rowell Gerald, by his father-in-law.  At the time, Day was working primarily as a journalist for newspapers in Auburn and Lewiston.  It was here that he wrote much of his poetry and fiction, building a reputation for his colorful depictions of life in Maine.

For the last 40 plus years the Holman Day House has been used by its owner as a psychological services center providing support in the  areas of health, family and school psychology.  The authors of Maine's Maine's Historic Places refer to 2 Goff as follows " The Holman Day House is unquestionably one of the finest Queen Anne Style wooden residences in the state.This is so not only in terms of the quality of the construction, but also in terms of the architectural detail. The interior is of similar high style."

The National Park service approved the modification of the  Carriage House hayloft into a hayloft library and conference center. The house has been featured on the cover of Victorian Homes.It is also featured as an example of the Queen Anne tower House in Historic Maine Homes: 300 Years of Great Homes by Christopher Glass and Brian Vanden Brink.

See also
National Register of Historic Places listings in Androscoggin County, Maine

References

Houses completed in 1895
Houses on the National Register of Historic Places in Maine
Houses in Auburn, Maine
National Register of Historic Places in Androscoggin County, Maine
Queen Anne architecture in Maine